Stephanie Riche is a French Paralympic alpine skier. She won two bronze medals at the 1994 Paralympic Winter Games in Lillehammer.

Career 
Riche competed in the 1994 Winter Paralympics in Lillehammer, Norway. She won two bronze medals in the giant slalom LWX-XII (third with a time of 3:27.20, behind Gerda Pamler, who won gold in 3:12.39, and Vreni Stoeckli, who won silver in 3:25.64), and in the super-G LWX-XII (realized time 1:37.99, Sarah Will won gold in 1:26.67, and Gerda Pamler won silver in 1:28.24).

She competed in the downhill  LWX-XII, finishing fourth,  and in the slalom  LWX-XII.

References 

Paralympic bronze medalists for France
Paralympic alpine skiers of France
Living people
Year of birth missing (living people)